Isaac Bradford (November 15, 1834 – December 19, 1898) was a Massachusetts mathematician and politician who served as the seventeenth Mayor of Cambridge, Massachusetts.

Personal life 
Bradford was born to Isaac Bradford and Sarah (Beckford) Bradford in Boston on November 15, 1834. He married Jane Ann (Hutchings) Davis in Medford, Massachusetts on April 30, 1862. They had two children, Ellen Hutchings and Isaac Bradford, Jr.

Notes

1834 births
1898 deaths
Mayors of Cambridge, Massachusetts
Cambridge, Massachusetts City Council members
19th-century American politicians